Sergio Jiménez Moraga (18 August 1933) is a Chilean politician who served as minister. Similarly, he is a very recognized figure in his country, where there's an energetic prize with his name.

References

External links
 Profile at Annales de la República

Chilean people
University of Chile alumni
Radical Party of Chile politicians
Radical Social Democratic Party of Chile politicians

1933 births

Living people